Lepisanthes senegalensis is a tree widespread through tropical Africa and tropical Asia to New Guinea and northern Australia.

Ecology
Wet valleys. Guangxi, Southern Yunnan, Bangladesh, Bhutan, India, Indochinese peninsula, Indonesia, Malaysia, Myanmar, Nepal, New Guinea, Philippines, Sri Lanka; Africa, Madagascar.

References

External links
 

senegalensis